Nikolai Vyacheslavovich Kryukov (born 11 November 1978 in Voronezh) is a Russian artistic gymnast. A three-time Olympian,> he was also the all-around champion at the 1999 World Artistic Gymnastics Championships in Tianjin.

See also
List of Olympic male artistic gymnasts for Russia

References

External links
 
 

1978 births
Living people
Russian male artistic gymnasts
Gymnasts at the 1996 Summer Olympics
Gymnasts at the 2000 Summer Olympics
Gymnasts at the 2008 Summer Olympics
Olympic gymnasts of Russia
Olympic gold medalists for Russia
Olympic bronze medalists for Russia
World champion gymnasts
Medalists at the World Artistic Gymnastics Championships
Sportspeople from Voronezh
Olympic medalists in gymnastics
Medalists at the 2000 Summer Olympics
Medalists at the 1996 Summer Olympics
21st-century Russian people